"What Doesn't Kill You" is a song by English singer-songwriter Jake Bugg. It was released as the lead single from his second studio album Shangri La (2013). It was released as a digital download in the United Kingdom on 24 September 2013. The song was written by Bugg and Iain Archer and produced by Rick Rubin. The song has peaked at number 44 on the UK Singles Chart and number 32 in Scotland. The title alludes to the Nietzsche quote.

Music video 
A music video to accompany the release of "What Doesn't Kill You" was first released onto YouTube on 23 September 2013 at a total length of three minutes.

Personnel 
 Lead vocals – Jake Bugg
 Lyrics – Jake Bugg, Iain Archer
 Producer – Rick Rubin

Track listings

Charts

Release history

References 

Jake Bugg songs
2013 singles
2013 songs
Songs written by Jake Bugg
Songs written by Iain Archer
Song recordings produced by Rick Rubin
Mercury Records singles